The National Alliance for Change (abbreviated ANC) is a social-democratic party in Togo, led by Jean-Pierre Fabre. The party emerged from a split within the Union of Forces for Change (UFC) following the 2010 Togolese presidential election.

References

External links 
 Official website
 

Political parties in Togo
Political parties established in 2010
2010 establishments in Togo